Aja! (in English: Drive!) is the seventh studio album by Finnish pop rock singer-songwriter Maija Vilkkumaa. It was released on September 18, 2015. The album is produced by Hank Solo. The album reached seventh place on its first week on The Official Finnish Charts

Singles
Two singles were released from Aja!, "Lissu ja mä" on May 22, 2015 and "Kissavideoita" on September 11, 2015.

Track listing
The (rough) English translations of the tracks are in the brackets.

References

2015 albums
Maija Vilkkumaa albums
Finnish-language albums